Kaspars Svārups (born 28 January 1994) is a Latvian footballer who plays as a forward for Italian club Sambenedettese.

Career

In 2012, Svārups was sent on loan to the youth academy of Russian top flight side Rubin from Ventspils in Latvia.

Before the second half of 2013–14, he was sent on loan to Polish second division club Nadwiślan Góra.

In 2017, he signed for Sortland IL in the Norwegian fourth division.

Before the second half of 2020–21, Svārups signed for Serbian team Bačka.

On 26 October 2021, he was signed by Italian Serie D club Sambenedettese.

References

External links
 
 

1994 births
Living people
People from Ventspils
Association football forwards
Latvian expatriate footballers
Latvia youth international footballers
Latvia under-21 international footballers
Latvian footballers
FK Ventspils players
FC Tranzīts players
FC Rubin Kazan players
FK Spartaks Jūrmala players
OFK Bačka players
FC Jūrmala players
Ilūkstes NSS players
Tvøroyrar Bóltfelag players
II liga players
Serbian SuperLiga players
Faroe Islands Premier League players
Serie D players
Expatriate footballers in Russia
Expatriate footballers in Poland
Expatriate footballers in Serbia
Expatriate footballers in the Faroe Islands
Expatriate footballers in Italy
Latvian expatriate sportspeople in Serbia
Latvian expatriate sportspeople in Poland
Latvian expatriate sportspeople in Russia
Latvian expatriate sportspeople in the Faroe Islands
Latvian expatriate sportspeople in Italy